The European Union Maritime Security Strategy (EUMSS, EU MSS or EU Maritime Security Strategy) is a maritime security strategy of the European Union. It was unanimously adopted by EU member states in June 2014. The EUMSS provides a framework for the EU's actions within maritime security in order to promote broader and more coherent approaches to identified maritime security challenges. Maritime security strategies have been adopted by a number of countries like France, India, United Kingdom and United States of America, and such strategies are used to organise a country or region's actions within maritime security by identifying maritime security challenges and relevant actors.

The EUMSS defines how the EU understands maritime security, it states the maritime security interests, risks and threats identified by the EU, and it suggests five areas for EU responses. The EUMSS  was followed by an action plan adopted by the General Affairs Council in December 2014. The action plan was later replaced by a revised version in June 2018.

Structure 
The EUMSS is a 16 pages long strategy paper. It consists of the following sections:

 Context
 Purpose and scope
 Principles and objectives
 Maritime security interests
 Maritime security risks and threats
 Strengthening the EU response
 Follow-up

Objectives, risks and threats 
The EUMSS states that it wants to “promote rules-based good governance at sea” and “enhance the role of the EU as a global actor and security provider” among others. The strategy also states its aim to improve cooperation between different sectors in the EU and advance information sharing between European actors in the maritime domain. Maritime security is a concept that does not have just one meaning, and different actors will attribute different issues to the concept. The EU embraces a comprehensive understanding of the term and issues under both national/regional security, human safety, economic development and marine environment are mentioned in the EUMSS.

The EUMSS clearly states which issues the European Union considers to fall under the maritime security term in its list of maritime security risks and threats. These include inter-state maritime disputes; human security; piracy and organised crime; migrant smuggling; trafficking of humans, arms and narcotics; terrorism and cyber-attacks against maritime critical infrastructure; chemical, biological, radiological and nuclear threats; freedom of navigation; illegal fishing; marine pollution and sea dumps; climate change and natural disasters; and illegal archaeological research.

Development and adoption 
"The EU did not create new institutions but primarily sketched out how existing bodies can work more efficiently together."Before the EUMSS was adopted in June 2014, the European Parliament initiated a study to identify the geostrategic maritime challenges for the EU. The study was conducted by researchers from the Finnish Institute of International Affairs (FIIA) and the Swedish Institute of International Affairs (SIIA) and published in 2013. The study argued that the future for the EU's presence in the maritime domain would be widely affected by a number of implications, such as bigger global interdependence of seas and sea routes, rising powers within maritime security such as Turkey and BRICS countries, crowded maritime traffic and overuse of resources in the maritime domain, security threats such as terrorism, sea-based crimes against critical infrastructure, and piracy. The study concluded: “The EU requires a comprehensive maritime security strategy that creates synergies between the EU’s Integrated Maritime Policy and the maritime dimension of CSDP and that focuses more comprehensively on the security and management of global maritime flows and sea-based activities in the global maritime commons.”

The work towards a maritime security strategy for the European Union had been on the table for a few years before the study was published. The idea had already arisen in 2010, when Spain, who held the Presidency of the Council of the European Union at the time, suggested it at a defence meeting. Two years before that, the EU had launched its first naval operation, Atalanta, and that was, according to several scholars, key to understand why the idea of a maritime security strategy came up at that time. Some EU member states including United Kingdom and Germany still opposed any integration in the defence area in 2010 and would initially not accept a text that referred to a possible maritime security strategy for the EU. However, in the end, the member states agreed on a text mentioning “the possible elaboration of a Security Strategy for the global maritime domain”. The next few years the European Commission and the European Union External Action (EEAS) were the main drivers in pushing a possible maritime security strategy forward, while the member states were not involved in the process. A Joint Communication was published in March 2014, and at this time Greece held the EU Presidency and pushed the idea of a maritime security strategy further forward. The EUMSS was discussed at several meetings and the text was revised several times. It seemed that the member states formed two groups with one pushing for more NATO references and less supranational regulations in the final text and the other wanting more integration in maritime security and EU security in general. The first group consisted among others of United Kingdom, Lithuania, Latvia, Estonia, Malta, Netherlands, Bulgaria, Romania, Sweden and Denmark, and the other group consisted of France, Spain, Italy, Portugal, Ireland, Finland, Belgium and Luxembourg among others. In the final strategy, references to NATO were kept and four supranational regulations were removed.

Action plan 
The EUMSS was followed by a detailed action plan adopted by the Council of the European Union in December 2014. It was built on four principles: cross-sectoral approach, functional integrity, respect for rules and principles, and maritime multilateralism. The action plan's goal was to deliver “cross-sectoral actions in a comprehensive and coordinated manner, mainstreaming maritime security into EU policies, strategies and instruments.” It contained 130 actions across the five areas external action; maritime awareness; capability development; risk management, protection of critical maritime infrastructure, and crisis response; and maritime security research and innovation, education, and training. For each action the action plan stated which actors were responsible for implementing the specific action.

An implementation report on the implementation of the EUMSS action plan by the European Commission concluded in 2016 that while a large number of issues identified in the EUMSS were followed, many actions from the action plan presented challenges. Another implementation report from 2017 concluded that the implementation of the actions in the EUMSS action plan was progressing well but a full picture of the advancements were needed.

Revised action plan 
The Council adopted a revised action plan in June 2018 “to ensure that the policy response remains fit for current and future challenges, in line with political priorities in a rapidly changing security environment”. The revised action plan contains 90 actions compared to the 130 actions of its predecessor and is divided into two parts: The first part focuses on “horizontal issues” that are identified in the EUMSS, while a new, second part focuses on regional responses to global challenges in the maritime domain. The revised action plan states that it is a “living document” that “operationalises the EUMSS” while also taking other EU policies into account.

Operations and actions linked to the EUMSS

Operation Atalanta 

Operation Atalanta or EUNAVFOR Somalia was the European Union's first naval operation launched in 2008 to counter piracy off the coast of Somalia and Horn of Africa. The operation has been extended several times and is still active. Scholars have argued that Operation Atalanta was the beginning of the security dimension to EU's maritime policies and that it paved the way for the EU Maritime Security Strategy to be formed and adopted; “since Atalanta, the development of EU maritime foreign and security policy issue has been substantial.” Operation Atalanta made the security aspect of the maritime dimension more tangible, and before Operation Atalanta was launched, EU member states generally looked to NATO for maritime security issues and naval operations. However, some member states were realising the need to act through the EU rather than NATO, and it was a mix of different factors that made sure Operation Atalanta was launched, e.g. “the recognition of the importance of the EU’s maritime frontiers, the unprecedented rise of piracy off Somalia, and a mixture of EU member states’ domestic and foreign interests”.

Operation Sophia 

Operation Sophia or EUNAVFOR Med was the second naval operation of the European Union. It was launched in 2015 in response to the refugee crisis with the aim to neutralise established smuggling routes for migrants in the Mediterranean Sea. The operation ended on March 31, 2020 but was succeeded the same day by Operation Irini, which is another military operation under the EU's Common Security and Defence Policy that operates in the same waters as Operation Sophia but has a different goal related to an arms embargo against Libya rather than migrant smuggling in the Mediterranean Sea. Operation Atalanta and Operation Sophia seemed to both be launched initially because of humanitarian issues - Operation Atalanta's goal was to protect humanitarian aid on its way to Somalia, and Operation Sophia was launched after a boat carrying migrants from Libya to Italy sank off the Italian island of Lampedusa in 2013, when more than 360 persons died.

EU Global Strategy 

The European Union Global Strategy (EUGS) is a policy from June 2016 that replaces the European Security Strategy from 2003. The EUGS puts emphasis on maritime security and refers to the EU as a “global maritime security provider”. The EUGS underlines the global role the European Union wants to take in the global maritime domain, and maritime security is a theme throughout the EUGS.

The future for the EUMSS 
“The existence of the MSS reflects the EU’s geopolitical interest in controlling the sea in its jurisdiction, as well as its intention to become a global maritime actor.”One scholar mentioned in 2016 that it is still unknown whether the two maritime milestones Operation Atalanta and the EUMSS are just the beginning for the EU as a global power in the maritime domain or whether they “only represent the ‘high water mark’” of the EU as a global power in the maritime domain. But after the adoption of the European Union Maritime Security Strategy, an action plan has been made and revised, a second and third naval operation have been launched, a Global Strategy for the European Union's Foreign And Security Policy has been adopted, and with 90 actions listed in the revised and still rolling action plan it is possible that the field of maritime security in the EU will continue to grow. Scholarly discussions have circled whether the EU is becoming a global humanitarian actor or a traditional realist great power.

Other maritime policies of the EU 
Several EU policies already had a maritime dimension before the adoption of the EUMSS, but they were spread across different policy areas. The first big step on the way to a more coherent EU policy in the maritime field was when the European Commission proposed the Integrated Maritime Policy (IMP) in 2007, but it was not until Operation Atalanta in 2008 and the EUMSS in 2014 that the security and defence aspect became clear.

The European Union also has policies on maritime safety, marine pollution, energy security, fisheries control, illegal trafficking, immigration, maritime surveillance (Common Information Sharing Environment (CISE)) and more. Security-related maritime policies and operations fall under the agreed foreign policy of the European Union, the Common Foreign and Security Policy (CFSP).

See also 

 Maritime security
 Ocean governance
 United Nations Convention on the Law of the Sea
 Common Foreign and Security Policy
 Common Security and Defence Policy
 European Union Global Strategy
 European Security Strategy
 Defence forces of the European Union
 List of military and civilian missions of the European Union
 Operation Atalanta
 Operation Sophia
 European Maritime Force
 US maritime strategy

References

Further reading 

 Book: Riddervold, Marianne (2018). The Maritime Turn in EU Foreign and Security Policies. Palgrave Macmillan.
 Book: Germond, Basil (2015). The Maritime Dimension of European Security. Palgrave Macmillan.

European Union
Maritime safety in Europe